The 1985 Eastern Washington Eagles football team represented Eastern Washington University in the 1985 NCAA Division I-AA football season. This was the Eagles' second season in Division I-AA, having moved up from Division II after 1983, and participated as an independent until joining the Big Sky Conference in 1987. They played their home games on campus at Woodward Field in Cheney, Washington, and one at Joe Albi Stadium in nearby Spokane.

Led by seventh-year head coach Dick Zornes, the Eagles went 8–2 in the regular season and earned the program's first Division I-AA playoff bid.

Schedule

References

Eastern Washington Eagles football seasons
Eastern Washington
Eastern Washington Eagles football